The Bishop of Victoria, Hong Kong was (from 1849 to 1951) the Ordinary of a corporation sole including Hong Kong and South China that ministered to 20,000 Anglicans.

Bishops
18491865 (ret.): George Smith
18671872 (res.): Charles Alford (later a Vicar in England)
18741897 (ret.): John Burdon (returned to missionary service)
18981906 (d.): Joseph Hoare
19071920 (res.): Gerard Lander (later Assistant Bishop of St Albans)
19201932 (res.): Ridley Duppuy (later Assistant Bishop of Worcester)
19321951: Ronald Hall (became the first Bishop of Hong Kong and Macao)

Assistant bishops
Among the assistant bishop of the diocese, there were:
Bishops of Guangzhou: Mok Sau Tsang (former Archdeacon of Canton) from 1935 (consecrated 25 January at the cathedral by Hall), Victor Halward from 1946, and Mo-Yung In from 1950;
Bishops of Yunnan-Guizhou: Andrew Y. Y. Tsu from 1940
Quentin Huang was consecrated Bishop of Kunming in 1946, and became first Bishop of Yunkwei upon that diocese's erection in 1948;
Mo-Yung In was consecrated Bishop of Canton in 1951
and James C. L. Wong was Bishop of Jesselton from 1960 until his 1965 translation to Taiwan.

Archdeacons
Archdeacons during Ronald Hall's time included: Lee Kau Yan, Archdeacon of Hong Kong from 1946; Tsang Kei Ngok, Archdeacon of Beihan from 1946; Mo-Yung In, of Beihan from 1949; and Chung Yan Laap (John), of Hong Kong from 1965.

Notes

 
Anglican bishops of Victoria, Hong Kong
1849 establishments in the British Empire